Shoichi Kinoshita (born 25 December 1954) is a Japanese biathlete. He competed in the 20 km individual event at the 1984 Winter Olympics.

References

External links
 

1954 births
Living people
Japanese male biathletes
Olympic biathletes of Japan
Biathletes at the 1984 Winter Olympics
Sportspeople from Niigata Prefecture